Lycenchelys sarsii, Sar's wolf eel, is a species of marine ray-finned fish belonging to the family Zoarcidae, the eelpouts.

It is native to coasts of Northern Atlantic Ocean.

References

sarsii
Fish described in 1871